"Blue Turning Grey over You" is a 1929 jazz standard. The music was composed by Fats Waller, with lyrics by Andy Razaf. Fats Waller recorded the song for Victor Records (catalog No. 25779) on June 9, 1937.

Louis Armstrong recorded a version for Okeh Records (catalog No. 41375) on February 1, 1930 and he recorded it again in 1955 for the album Satch Plays Fats.

Lee Morse recorded a version for Columbia Records in 1930.

Harry James recorded live versions of the tune in the mid-1940s that were released on the albums The Uncollected Harry James And His Orchestra, 1943-1946 Vol. 2 (Hindsight HSR-123, 1978), One Night Stand With Harry James on Staten Island (Joyce LP-1046, 1979), and Harry James: The Post War Period (JRC-1207).

Maxine Sullivan - for her album A Tribute to Andy Razaf (1956).

Frankie Laine included the song in his album Rockin' (1957).

Kenny Ball and His Jazzmen - for the album Kenny Ball and His Jazzmen (1961).

Billie Holiday - Billie's Blues (1951)

Ringo Starr recorded a version in 1970 for his debut solo album Sentimental Journey.

See also
List of jazz standards

References

1920s jazz standards
1929 songs
Louis Armstrong songs
Music published by MPL Music Publishing
Okeh Records singles
Songs with music by Fats Waller